Marigold IceUnity are a senior-level synchronized skating team from Helsinki, Finland, representing the figure skating club Helsingin Luistelijat. Coached by Anu Oksanen and Tiina Turunen, they are five-time World Champions and were ranked second in the world in 2015 by the International Skating Union.

Helsingin Luistelijat also fields the Musketeers at the junior level, Starlights  at the novice level, Sunlights at the juvenile level, Sunflowers at the pre-juvenile level, Moonlights and Moonshadows at the basic junior level, Silverlights at the basic novice level, All Stars at the basic senior level, Icemen United (men’s team) and Creme De Ments at the adult level.

Programs

Competitive results (1999–2009)

Competitive results (2009–15)

References

External links

 Official website of Marigold IceUnity

Senior synchronized skating teams
Sports teams in Finland
Figure skating in Finland
Sports clubs in Helsinki
World Synchronized Skating Championships medalists